Opawskie Mountains Landscape Park (Park Krajobrazowy Gór Opawskich) is a protected area (Landscape Park) in the Opawskie Mountains in south-western Poland, established in 1988, covering an area of .

The Park lies within Opole Voivodeship: in Nysa County (Gmina Głuchołazy) and Prudnik County (Gmina Prudnik, Gmina Lubrza), between the cities of Prudnik and Głuchołazy.

Within the Landscape Park are four nature reserves.

Flora of the Park 
There are over 500 species of vascular plants in the area of the Opawskie Mountains Landscape Park, most of them are native species.

 Allium ursinum
 Atropa belladonna
 Aruncus dioicus
 Asplenium septentrionale
 Carlina acaulis
 Cephalanthera longifolia
 Corydalis intermedia
 Daphne mezereum
 Digitalis grandiflora
 Digitalis purpurea
 Epipactis albensis
 Lilium martagon
 Lysimachia nemorum
 Orchis mascula
 Orobanche flava
 Ranunculus platanifolius
 Struthiopteris spicant

Fauna of the Park 
There are 163 species of protected animals in the Opawskie Mountains Landscape Park, 154 of which are under strict protection.

Amphibians 
 Alpine newt
 Common frog
 Edible frog
 European fire-bellied toad
 Fire salamander
 Marsh frog
 Pelobates fuscus
 Yellow-bellied toad

Reptiles 
 Anguis fragilis
 Grass snake
 Sand lizard
 Smooth snake
 Vipera berus

Birds 
 Black stork
 Black woodpecker
 Common kingfisher
 Corn crake
 Eurasian eagle-owl
 Eurasian hoopoe
 European green woodpecker
 Great spotted woodpecker
 Grey-headed woodpecker
 Grey wagtail
 Middle spotted woodpecker
 White stork
 White-throated dipper

Mammals 
 Brown long-eared bat
 Capreolus
 Cervus
 Daubenton's bat
 European mole
 Greater mouse-eared bat
 Hare
 Lesser horseshoe bat
 Natterer's bat
 Northern bat
 Sciurus
 Western barbastelle
 Wild boar

References 

Opawskie Mountains
Parks in Opole Voivodeship